Recurvaria costimaculella is a moth of the family Gelechiidae. It is found on Sicily.

References

Moths described in 2001
Recurvaria
Moths of Europe